The Real Housewives of New Jersey is an American reality television series that debuted on May 12, 2009, and airs on Bravo. It is the network's fourth installation of The Real Housewives franchise. The series thirteenth season chronicles seven women in and around several communities in northern New Jersey—Teresa Giudice, Melissa Gorga, Dolores Catania, Margaret Josephs, Jennifer Aydin, Danielle Cabral and Rachel Fuda —as they balance their personal and business lives, along with their social circle.

Former cast members featured over the previous twelve seasons are: Dina Cantin (1-2, 6), Jacqueline Laurita (1-5, 7), Caroline Manzo (1-5), Danielle Staub (1-2), Kathy Wakile (3-5), Teresa Aprea (6), Amber Marchese (6), Nicole Napolitano (6), Siggy Flicker (7-8), and Jackie Goldschneider (9-12).

, a total of 222 original episodes of The Real Housewives of New Jersey have aired.

Series overview

Episodes

Season 1 (2009)

Dina Cantin (then Manzo), Teresa Giudice, Jacqueline Laurita, Caroline Manzo and Danielle Staub are introduced as series regulars.

Season 2 (2010)

Cantin departed as a series regular after episode 7. Kim Granatell served in a recurring capacity.

Season 3 (2011)

Staub departed as a series regular. Melissa Gorga and Kathy Wakile joined the cast.

Season 4 (2012)

Kim DePaola served in a recurring capacity.

Season 5 (2013)

DePaola, Jennifer Dalton and Rosie Pierri served in recurring capacities.

Season 6 (2014)

Laurita, Manzo and Wakile departed as series regulars. Dina Cantin (then Manzo) rejoined the cast as a series regular. Teresa Aprea, Amber Marchese and Nicole Napolitano joined the cast. Pierri, Laurita and Wakile then served in recurring capacities.

Season 7 (2016)
 Cantin, Aprea, Marchese and Napolitano departed as series regulars. Laurita rejoined the cast as a series regular. Dolores Catania and Siggy Flicker joined the cast. Wakile and Pierri served in recurring capacities.

Season 8 (2017–18)

Laurita departed as a series regular. Margaret Josephs joined the cast. Staub served in a recurring capacity.

Season 9 (2018–19)

Flicker departed as a series regular. Jennifer Aydin and Jackie Goldschneider joined the cast. Staub served in a recurring capacity.

Season 10 (2019–20)

Staub served in a recurring capacity.

Season 11 (2021)

Season 12 (2022)

Traci Johnson served in a recurring capacity.

Season 13 (2023)

Goldschneider departed as a series regular, whilst serving in a recurring capacity. Danielle Cabral and Rachel Fuda joined the cast. Jennifer Fessler also served in a recurring capacity.

References

External links 
 

Real Housewives of New Jersey episodes
New Jersey episodes